The Son of Kong (also known and publicized simply as Son of Kong) is a 1933 American Pre-Code adventure monster film produced by RKO Pictures. Directed by Ernest Schoedsack and featuring special effects by Willis O'Brien and Buzz Gibson, the film stars Robert Armstrong, Helen Mack and Frank Reicher. The film is the sequel to King Kong, being released just nine months after and is the second entry of the King Kong franchise.

Plot

A month after the destruction in New York City by Kong, filmmaker Carl Denham has been implicated in so many lawsuits that he is almost bankrupt. Denham leaves the city aboard the Venture with Captain Englehorn, who knows he too will be similarly prosecuted if he stays, but their efforts to make money shipping cargo around Asia are not very successful. After arriving in the Dutch port of Dakang, Denham and Englehorn attend a show of performing monkeys, which ends with a song ("Runaway Blues"), sung by a young woman, Hilda Petersen, whom Denham is immediately attracted to.

That night, Mr. Petersen, Hilda's father, who runs the monkey show, stays up drinking with a Norwegian skipper, Nils Helstrom, who had lost his ship under questionable circumstances. The two men argue and then fight, but during the struggle, Petersen is killed, and his tent burns down. Distraught, Hilda releases all the monkeys from their cages. Soon after, Denham and Englehorn meet Helstrom, who was the man who had sold to Denham the map to Kong's island, and Helstrom convinces them that there is a treasure on the island. So Denham and Englehorn agree to go back to the island to find the treasure. Later, Denham meets Hilda while she is trying to recapture her monkeys and tries to cheer her up. Despite her pleas for her safety, Denham refuses to take her with him when he leaves Dakang. However, shortly after the ship leaves out to sea, Hilda is found having stowed away on board.

Helstrom talks Hilda into silence, then incites a mutiny on board the Venture, but the sailors want no more captains and force him along with Denham, Englehorn, Hilda, and Charlie the cook away in a lifeboat. The group soon land on Skull Island and discover that the natives now blame Denham for Kong's destruction in their village, forcing them to retreat and into the interior of the island, where they split up into two groups. Denham and Hilda soon encounter a giant albino gorilla, smaller than Kong,  but still over twice the height of a man. The giant ape is stuck in quicksand, so Denham helps him out of it and bandages the ape's injured finger, establishing trust with the ape. Denham tells Hilda that he believes the ape is Kong's son, and names him "Little Kong". Later, Englehorn, Charlie, and Helstrom are attacked by a Styracosaurus which chases them into a cave. Denham and Hilda are attacked by a giant cave bear, but "Little Kong" fights it and forces it away.  Helstrom had actually made up his treasure-story to get a free ride away from Dakang, but with the ape's help, Denham and Hilda find a real treasure- a huge jewel on the head of a seemingly abandoned giant stone idol, which he takes for safe-keeping. Little Kong, Denham, and Hilda are attacked by a Nothosaurus, but "Little Kong" fights and kills it. A storm ensues and Helstrom tries to escape in the lifeboat, but is killed by an Elasmosaurus. Englehorn, Hilda and Charlie quickly retrieve and board the lifeboat, but a violent earthquake and hurricane strikes the island, and it begins to sink into the ocean. The water soon surrounds Denham and "Little Kong" atop a tall mound, and as the ape's foot gets stuck in the cracking mound, he sacrifices himself to save Denham by holding him above the water. The group in the boat reach Denham just in time, as the ape's hand, with Denham's bandage still on his finger, sinks below. On the deck of a rescue ship, Denham and Hilda contemplate the tragic fate of Kong's son, and of their future together, but Denham shows Hilda the jewel he salvaged, assuring her that it will provide financial security for all of them. It was Denham's intention to split the fortune four ways (Denham, Hilda, Englehorn and Charlie), but Hilda convinces him that three ways is just fine, indicating that she is throwing her fortunes in with Denham for the long haul.

Cast

Production

The film was produced and released in 1933, immediately following the success of King Kong (1933), and was a modest success. Script writer Ruth Rose intentionally made no attempt to make a serious film on the logic that it could not surpass the first. It has a long draggy exposition before finally hitting some action on the return to Skull Island. She stated, "If you can't make it bigger, make it funnier." For his part, Denham's actor, Robert Armstrong, preferred the second film, saying that the sequel offered more character development for Carl Denham. In other words, his character Denham gets the young girl at the end.

The script/screenplay featured scenes of tribal warfare and a climactic dinosaur stampede during the massive cyclone/earthquake that sinks Skull Island at the film's end. The stampede was going to utilize the models that had been built for Creation (1931) (most being used in the earlier King Kong). However, these sequences were never filmed due to the film's tight budget and shooting schedule.

Helen Mack's character is never referred to as "Hilda" in the film. The name "Hilda" is used in the credits and her father refers to her as "La Belle Helene" during the show. Denham just calls her "kid".

Little Kong was referred to as "Kiko" during production, but this name is never used in the film or in publicity materials.

Some of the stop-motion models used for King Kong were also used for The Son of Kong. The non animated  "long face" Kong armature, from the log bridge and Tyrannosaurus fight sequences, was also used for "Little Kong". Of the two known existing model-armatures of Kong, one is currently owned by film historian and collector Bob Burns, and the other is owned by director Peter Jackson, who remade King Kong in 2005. Also, the same Brontosaurus model used for the raft scene in King Kong can be glimpsed in the sea as the island is sinking. The stop motion animation in the film (done by Willis O'Brien who also did the effects in King Kong) is not as extensive as in the original, but included is a sequence where a Styracosaurus chases the explorers through the jungle. Today, the original Styracosaurus model, along with other original 1933 "Kong" dinosaurs, is also now owned by director Peter Jackson. An interesting giant bear is added to the 
creatures “Little Kong” challenges.

Creatures
 "Little Kong": Kong's albino son, who is much smaller and friendlier. At the end, he drowns during the storm and flood destruction whilst sacrificing himself to save Denham.
 Archaeopteryx: a prehistoric bird seen flying around the island, likely survived the island's sinking by flying to safety.
 Rhamphorhynchus: a prehistoric flying reptile seen flying around the island, likely survived island's sinking by flying to safety.
 Styracosaurus: a gigantic dinosaur that chases Charlie, Englehorn, and Helstrom into a cave, and later drowned when the island sank. The stop-motion model was originally used in test-filming for, but not included in, "King Kong".
 Triceratops: a gigantic dinosaur in a deleted scene, which later drowned when the island sank. This was another stop-motion model that was originally used in test-filming for, but not included in, "King Kong".
 Cave bear: a gigantic prehistoric mammal that chases Denham and Hilda, which is fought and forced away by "Little Kong", and which later drowned when the island sank.
 Nothosaurus: a prehistoric reptile  that attacks Denham, Hilda and "Little Kong" after they uncover the treasure, and which is killed by "Little Kong". 
 Elasmosaurus: a gigantic prehistoric aquatic reptile that attacks and kills Helstrom when he attempts to escape in the lifeboat, likely survived when the island sank by being a marine creature. The scene of the Elasmosaurus snapping its jaws is similar to the Brontosaurus snapping-jaws scene in "King Kong". 
 Brontosaurus: a gigantic dinosaur that appears roaring during the earthquake and storm, before drowning when the island sank. The stop-motion model was also originally used in "King Kong".

Release

Home media
The Son of Kong was released on VHS by Nostalgia Merchant in the 1980s and again in 1991 by Turner Home Entertainment.

In 2005 it received a DVD release and was available both by itself and as part of a collector's set alongside King Kong (1933) and Mighty Joe Young (1949), with commentary by Ray Harryhausen. In the UK and in Italy it was released on DVD in 2010.

In 2014 it was featured on Warner Archive Instant, a streaming service dedicated to the classic films and animation properties owned by Time Warner, Inc.

Warner Bros released a Blu-ray version on October 27, 2015.

Reception

Critical response
The film received mixed reviews. In the New York Times review of the film, they described it as a "low melodrama with a number of laughs" that were deemed to be satisfying, though they added that the vision of comedy by the producers would be open to discussion. Variety described it as "fair entertainment". Among modern critics, review aggregation site Rotten Tomatoes reported that 42% have given the film a positive review based on 12 reviews, with an average rating of 4.90 out of 10. On Metacritic, the film has a weighted average score of 50 out of 100 based on 6 critic reviews, indicating "mixed or average reviews". It made a profit of $133,000.

See also
 List of stop motion films

References

External links

 
 
 

1933 films
1933 horror films
1933 comedy films
1930s fantasy adventure films
1930s English-language films
1930s monster movies
American films with live action and animation
American fantasy adventure films
American black-and-white films
American sequel films
Films about dinosaurs
Films scored by Max Steiner
Films directed by Ernest B. Schoedsack
Films set in the Indian Ocean
Films set in New York City
Films set on fictional islands
Films using stop-motion animation
King Kong (franchise) films
Lost world films
RKO Pictures films
1930s American films